The Face of the World is a 1921 American silent drama film directed by Irvin Willat and starring Edward Hearn, Barbara Bedford and Lloyd Whitlock.

Cast
 Edward Hearn as Harold Mark
 Barbara Bedford as Thora
 Harry Duffield as Grandfather
 Lloyd Whitlock as Monsieur Duparc
 Gordon Mullen as Ivar Holth
 J.P. Lockney as Dr. Prahl
 Fred Huntley as Attorney Gundahl

References

Bibliography
 Munden, Kenneth White. The American Film Institute Catalog of Motion Pictures Produced in the United States, Part 1. University of California Press, 1997.

External links
 

1921 films
1921 drama films
1920s English-language films
American silent feature films
Silent American drama films
Films directed by Irvin Willat
Films distributed by W. W. Hodkinson Corporation
1920s American films